Bird Island is an island located in the country of Belize.

Located near Tobacco Caye, Belize, this protected island is home to frigatebirds and brown footed boobies and tourists are not allowed to dock or set foot on the island. This little Island is formally known as Man-O-War Caye.In 2001, a hurricane destroyed the mangrove forest situated on the island yet birds continued to roost. The forest has regrown and the ecosystem been restored.

 Uninhabited islands of Belize
Islands of Belize
Caribbean Sea